Erich Schelling (11 September 1904 Wiesloch – 14 November 1986 Karlsruhe) was a German architect.  

He was born in Wiesloch near Heidelberg and studied at the State Technical College (later the Fachhochschule) in Karlsruhe from 1924 to 1928 and the Technical University (today the Karlsruhe Institute of Technology), until May 1933. 

He was made head of the architectural office at Hermann Alker before leaving to set up his own office in Karlsruhe in 1937. Later that year he was appointed Professor of Architecture at the State Technical College. His first major commission was the conversion of a Karlsruhe building to be a Nazi publishing house in 1939. In 1942 he opened a second office in Strasbourg, where he was commissioned to construct a new administrative building and to redesign the Senate Council Chamber for the University of Strasbourg.  After the war he worked on the reconstruction of industry, particularly on the FAG Kugelfischer factories in Schweinfurt. 

His major achievement, in collaboration with the engineer Ulrich Finsterwalder, was the design and construction in 1953 of the Schwarzwaldhalle in Karlsruhe, which has the first hanging paraboloid roof in reinforced concrete to be constructed in Europe.

From 1955 to his death, he supervised the development of Karlsruhe's nuclear research centre, including the research reactor, the central administrative building, the college of nuclear technology, the information centre, the security headquarter and a variety of workshops and laboratories.

Schelling's buildings help define the image of Karlsruhe. Some of them, such as the Schwarzwaldhalle, the Nancy Hall, the Chamber of Crafts and Trades and the State Insurance Institute, are listed as cultural monuments.

He married interior designer Trude Schelling-Karrer, who collaborated with him in his work. In 1992, after Schelling's death, she founded the Schelling Architecture Foundation, which she ran until her own death in 2009. The Foundation awards the Schelling Architecture Award and the Schelling Architecture Theory Award every two years in his honour.

Work 

 1939 Publishing House for the Nazi propaganda newspaper Der Führer (today the Badische Neueste Nachrichten) in the Lammstrasse, Karlsruhe
 1949–60: Factories for FAG Kugelfischer, Schweinfurt
 1952: Reconstruction of the administrative building for the Dresdner Bank in Marktplatz, Karlsruhe
 1953: Administration building for the Badenia Building Society, Karlsruhe
 1953: Schwarzwaldhalle, Karlsruhe
 1954/55: Gartenhalle, Karlsruhe
 1954/55: Wildparkstadion, Karlsruhe
 1954/55: Administration building for the Volksbank in Marktplatz, Karlsruhe
 1954: Extension of the Town Hall, Schweinfurt
 1955–86: Development of the Karlsruhe Institute of Technology
 1957/58: Chamber of Crafts and Trades, Karlsruhe
 1958–63: High rise building for the State Insurance Institute, Baden, Karlsruhe
 1958–60: Extension of the Federal Law Courts, Karlsruhe
 1961–66: City Theatre, Schweinfurt
 1964–66: Nancy Hall, Karlsruhe
 1968–70: Institut Max von Laue-Paul Langevin, Grenoble
 1969–71: Condominium in Karlsruhe-Oberreut
 1974–77: Extension of the State Insurance Institute, Baden, Karlsruhe

Other work 
 1940–42: Design for "New Strasbourg”
 1952: Design for the Tullabad, Karlsruhe
 1959: Museum Georg Schäfer, Schweinfurt
 1960: First competition  for the Badische Staatstheater Karlsruhe
 1963: Second competition for the Badische Staatstheater, Karlsruhe

Bibliography 
 Erich Schelling – Architekt 1904–1986. With a foreword by Heinrich Klotz. Aries, München 1994,

Schelling Architecture Award
Source:

1992: Helmut Swiczinsky & Wolf D. Prix of Coop Himmelb(l)au
1994: Zaha Hadid
1996: Peter Zumthor
1998: Sauerbruch Hutton, Busse & Geitner
2000: Kazuyo Sejima
2004: Benjamin Foerster-Baldenius, raumlabor
2006: Anne Lacaton & Jean-Philippe Vassal
2008: Jan Olav Jensen & Børre Skodvin, Jensen & Skodvin Architects
2010: Wang Shu & Lu Wenyu of Amateur Architecture Studio
2012: Al Borde Arquitectos
2014: Diébédo Francis Kéré
2016: Architecten de Vylder Vinck Taillieu
2018: Rotor Architects
2020: Lina Ghotmeh

Schelling Architecture Theory Prize
Source:

1992: Werner Durth
1994: Wolfgang Pehnt
1996: Nikolaus Kuhnert
1998: Stanislaus von Moos
2000: Martin Steinmann
2004: Manuel Castells
2006: Werner Sewing
2008: Friedrich Achleitner
2010: Jean-Louis Cohen
2012: Kenneth Frampton
2014: Juhani Pallasmaa
2016: Doug Saunders
2018: Keller Easterling
2020: Itohan Osayimwese
2022: Paola Viganò

References

External links 
 Erich Schelling: Architekt der Schwarzwaldhalle, Stadt Karlsruhe

1904 births
1986 deaths
20th-century German architects
People from Wiesloch
Architects from Karlsruhe